Raúl López Gómez (born 23 February 1993), also known as El Dedos, is a Mexican professional footballer who plays as a right-back for Liga MX club Santos Laguna.

Club career

Youth
López joined Guadalajara's youth academy in 2008. He continued through Chivas Youth Academy successfully going through U-17 and U-20. Until finally reaching the first team, Benjamín Galindo was the coach promoting lópez to first team.

Guadalajara
López made his professional debut under coach Benjamín Galindo on 3 March 2013 in a 1–1 draw against UNAM.

Correcaminos UAT (loan)
In January 2014 he went sent out on loan to second division team Correcaminos UAT for six months in order to gain experience and playing time.

Coras de Tepic (loan)
The following season, López was again sent out on loan for six months, this time to Coras de Tepic. He had a great season and helped lead the squad to the 2014 Ascenso MX Apertura final; the squad ended up losing.

Guadalajara (return)
After a great season with Coras and the Mexico national under-20 football team, López returned to Chivas and became a regular starter. On 1 March 2015 he scored his first career goal with Guadalajara in a 3–0 win against Monterrey.

Pachuca
On June 8, 2016, Lopez was signed from Guadalajara for an undisclosed amount.

Style of Play
López is one of Liga MX most solid and complete right-back. He is both technically gifted defensively and in attacking. He's able to do long runs on the side that many time lead with a cross and goal, and is a free kick specialist.

International career

Youth
On 18 September 2015, López was selected by coach Raul Gutierrez to play in the 2015 CONCACAF Men's Olympic Qualifying Championship.

Senior
On 8 November 2015, López was called up to the senior national team to replace Paul Aguilar, who was injured.

Career statistics

Honours
Guadalajara
Copa MX: Apertura 2015

Pachuca
CONCACAF Champions League: 2016–17

Mexico Youth
Central American and Caribbean Games: 2014
CONCACAF Olympic Qualifying Championship: 2015

References

External links
 
 Raúl López Gómez at Chivas de Corazon
 
 
 
 

1993 births
Living people
Footballers from Jalisco
People from Zapopan, Jalisco
C.D. Guadalajara footballers
Correcaminos UAT footballers
Liga MX players
Mexico under-20 international footballers
Mexico international footballers
Association football wingers
Association football fullbacks
Footballers at the 2016 Summer Olympics
Olympic footballers of Mexico
2017 CONCACAF Gold Cup players
Mexican footballers